The men's coxless pair event at the 2020 Summer Olympics took place from 24 to 29 July 2021 at the Sea Forest Waterway. 26 rowers from 13 nations competed.

Background

This was the 25th appearance of the event, which was not held at the first Games in 1896 (when bad weather forced the cancellation of all rowing events), the second games in 1900, the 1908 games, and the 1912 games.

The reigning medalists in the event were New Zealand, South Africa, and Italy. All 3 qualified to the competition.

Qualification

Each National Olympic Committee (NOC) was limited to a single boat (one rower) in the event since 1912. There were 13 qualifying places in the men's double sculls:

 11 from the 2019 World Championship
 2 from the final qualification regatta

Competition format

This rowing event is a coxless pair event, meaning that each boat is propelled by two rowers. The "coxless" portion means that there is no coxswain. Each rower has one oar. The course uses the 2000 metres distance that became the Olympic standard in 1912.

During the first round three heats were held. The first three boats in each heat advanced to the semifinals, with the others relegated to the repechage.

The repechage offered rowers a second chance to qualify for the semifinals. Placing in the repechage determined which semifinal the boat would race in. The top three boats in the repechage moved on to the semifinals, with the remaining boats being eliminated.

Two semifinals were held, each with 6 boats. The top three boats from each heat advanced to Final A and competed for a medal. The remaining boats advanced to Final B.

The third and final round was the finals. Each final determined a set of rankings. The A final determined the medals, along with the rest of the places through 6th, while the B final gave rankings from 7th to 12th.

Schedule

The competition was held over six days. 

All times are Japan Standard Time (UTC+9)

Results

Heats
The first three of each heat qualified for the semifinals, while the remainder went to the repechage.

Heat 1

Heat 2

Heat 3

Repechage

The first three pairs in the repechage qualified for the semifinals, while the fourth pair was eliminated.

Semifinals

Semifinal A/B 1

Semifinal A/B 2

Finals

Final B

Final A

References

Men's coxless pair
Men's events at the 2020 Summer Olympics